Tennessee Pass elevation  is a high mountain pass in the Rocky Mountains of central Colorado in the United States. The pass was named after Tennessee, the native state of a group of early prospectors.


Route

The pass traverses the Continental Divide north of Leadville in a gap between the northern end of the Sawatch Range to the west and the northern end of the Mosquito Range to the east. It connects the headwaters of the Arkansas River to the south with the upper valley of the Eagle River (in the watershed of the Colorado River) to the north. The pass is traversed by U.S. Highway 24, allowing access between Leadville and Interstate 70 in the Eagle Valley. The pass has a gentle approach on both sides with few steep gradients and no major hairpin curves. The summit of the pass is nearly level. The road over the pass is generally open all year round, easily negotiable by most vehicles, and closes only during severe winter storms.

The summit of the pass is the location of Ski Cooper, a ski area in the San Isabel National Forest operated by permit from the United States Forest Service. Most of the area is above the tree line, providing a panoramic view of the peaks of the Sawatch Range to visitors. The area was formerly a World War II training ground for United States Army troops of the 10th Mountain Division from nearby Camp Hale. A memorial to troops of the division is located at the summit of the pass.

Railroad line

The Denver & Rio Grande Western Railroad constructed a narrow gauge railroad over Tennessee Pass in 1881 as part of its extension to the Aspen area in order to beat the Colorado Midland's standard gauge route to the rich mining area. In 1945, the old Tennessee Pass Tunnel was replaced by a newer tunnel. In recent times, the Rio Grande's Tennessee Pass line was the highest active mainline railroad mountain pass in the United States. The line, now owned by the Union Pacific (UP), is currently out of use but the tracks remain in place.

Once the Moffat Tunnel and Dotsero Cutoff were constructed, the line through Tennessee Pass became a secondary route. The Moffat Tunnel route had a maximum grade of 2%. The west side of the Tennessee Pass route has grades up to 3%. However, the east side of the Tennessee Pass has a maximum grade of only 1.4%.

The Denver & Rio Grande's acquisition by Southern Pacific (SP) in 1988 made Tennessee Pass once again the preferred transcontinental route. SP had a central route from California through to Kansas via Donner Pass, Tennessee Pass and trackage rights on the former Missouri Pacific route from Pueblo, Colorado into Kansas. The Moffat Tunnel route was kept in use.

In 1996, UP bought Southern Pacific. UP preferred the Moffat Tunnel for routing traffic. The last revenue train went over the Tennessee Pass on August 23, 1997. Soon after UP ran this last train, they applied to the Surface Transportation Board for permission to abandon the line.

Currently, the line is not of much use as the former Missouri Pacific line to Pueblo has been partially abandoned so trains would have to travel from Denver south to Pueblo before heading west.

The  of the Tennessee Pass line through the Royal Gorge is currently operated by the Royal Gorge Route Railroad, who operates excursion trains out of Cañon City.

On July 10, 2012, part of the old tunnel collapsed, creating a sinkhole that damaged U.S. Highway 24 and forced its temporary closure between Redcliff and Leadville. The newer tunnel was not damaged.

A report released by the Colorado Department of Transportation on September 4, 2014 stated the following about the line:

Union Pacific began actively discussing the sale of the line to Colorado Pacific in 2019, for an amount of $10 million. However, Colorado Pacific wanted to pay only the $8.8 million that the line was valued at. After a long battle in court, the ICC declared that they would not force a sale, but if other evidence was found, Colorado Pacific could re-file the report. , Colorado Pacific attempted another forced sale, this time saying they’ll run passenger/excursion service over the route. Union Pacific responded by stating they were in active negotiations for Rio Grande Pacific to operate the line and were opposed to Colorado Pacific's bid.  On December 31, 2020 Rio Grande Pacific subsidiary Colorado, Midland & Pacific Railway Company, announced it had entered in an agreement with Union Pacific to explore reopening, leasing and operating the line for both potential commuter and freight services.

Water diversion

Tennessee Pass is the location of the first transbasin diversion project to move water from the Colorado River Basin over the continental divide to the Arkansas River. The  Ewing Placer Ditch (or just Ewing Ditch) was constructed in 1880 and remains in use. It transfers water from Piney Creek east of the pass, a tributary of the Eagle River over the pass to the head of Tennessee Creek. The ditch may have originally been used to provide water for placer mining, but the Otero Canal Company used the water for irrigation before selling the ditch to the Pueblo Board of Water Works in 1955.

A second ditch was constructed at Tennessee pass in 1929, the  Wurts Ditch. This was built by William Wurts to provide irrigation water, but Pueblo purchased this ditch in 1938, and in 1953, they extended the ditch another  westward along the south flank of the Eagle River valley.

See also
Treasure: In Search of the Golden Horse

References

Rail mountain passes of the United States
Mountain passes of Colorado
Landforms of Lake County, Colorado
Landforms of Eagle County, Colorado
U.S. Route 24
Denver and Rio Grande Western Railroad
Transportation buildings and structures in Lake County, Colorado
Transportation buildings and structures in Eagle County, Colorado
Railroad tunnels in Colorado